Landaura railway station is a railway station on Moradabad–Ambala line under the Moradabad railway division of Northern Railway zone. This is situated at Landhaura in Haridwar district of the Indian state of Uttarakhand.

References

Railway stations in Haridwar district
Moradabad railway division